McMinns Lagoon is an outer suburban area in Darwin. It appeared on Goyder's plan of the Survey of Port Darwin and Environs in 1869.

References

External links

Place Names

Suburbs of Darwin, Northern Territory